Hyperaspis taeniata, the ribboned lady beetle, is a species of lady beetle in the family Coccinellidae. It is found in North America.

Subspecies
These four subspecies belong to the species Hyperaspis taeniata:
 Hyperaspis taeniata cruentoides Dobzhansky
 Hyperaspis taeniata perpallida Dobzhansky
 Hyperaspis taeniata rufescens Dobzhansky
 Hyperaspis taeniata taeniata

References

Further reading

 

Coccinellidae
Articles created by Qbugbot
Beetles described in 1852